Panindícuaro is one of the 113 municipalities of Michoacán, in central Mexico. The municipal seat lies at the town of the same name.

References

Municipalities of Michoacán